Concholepas is a genus of medium-sized to large predatory sea snails, marine gastropod mollusks in the family Muricidae, the rock shells.

Species
Species within the genus Concholepas include:
 Concholepas concholepas (Bruguière, 1789)
Synonyms
 Concholepas (Coralliobia) H. Adams & A. Adams, 1853 : synonym of Coralliobia H. Adams & A. Adams, 1853 accepted as Coralliophila H. Adams & A. Adams, 1853
 Concholepas (Coralliobia) fimbriata A. Adams, 1853: synonym of Coralliophila fimbriata (A. Adams, 1853)
 Concholepas cuvieri Deshayes, 1853: synonym of  Concholepas concholepas (Bruguière, 1789)
 Concholepas decipiens Mabille, 1886: synonym of  Concholepas concholepas (Bruguière, 1789) 
 Concholepas densestriatus Mabille, 1886: synonym of  Concholepas concholepas (Bruguière, 1789) 
 Concholepas granosus Mabille, 1886: synonym of  Concholepas concholepas (Bruguière, 1789) 
 Concholepas imbricatus Valenciennes, 1832: synonym of  Concholepas concholepas (Bruguière, 1789) 
 Concholepas laevigatus Valenciennes, 1832: synonym of  Concholepas concholepas (Bruguière, 1789) 
 Concholepas minor Mabille, 1886: synonym of  Concholepas concholepas (Bruguière, 1789) 
 Concholepas oblongus Reeve, 1863: synonym of  Concholepas concholepas (Bruguière, 1789) 
 Concholepas patagonicus Mabille, 1886: synonym of  Concholepas concholepas (Bruguière, 1789) 
 Concholepas peruviana Lamarck, 1801: synonym of  Concholepas concholepas (Bruguière, 1789) 
 Concholepas rhombicus Mabille, 1886: synonym of  Concholepas concholepas (Bruguière, 1789) 
 Concholepas similis Mabille, 1886: synonym of  Concholepas concholepas (Bruguière, 1789) 
 Concholepas splendens Mabille, 1886: synonym of  Concholepas concholepas (Bruguière, 1789) 
 Concholepas verucundus Mabille, 1886: synonym of  Concholepas concholepas (Bruguière, 1789)

Life habits
These animals are predatory, like almost all the muricids.

References

 Claremont M., Vermeij G.J., Williams S.T. & Reid D.G. (2013) Global phylogeny and new classification of the Rapaninae (Gastropoda: Muricidae), dominant molluscan predators on tropical rocky seashores. Molecular Phylogenetics and Evolution 66: 91–102

External links
 Lamarck, J. B. (1801). Système des animaux sans vertèbres, ou tableau général des classes, des ordres et des genres de ces animaux; Présentant leurs caractères essentiels et leur distribution, d'apres la considération de leurs rapports naturels et de leur organisation, et suivant l'arrangement établi dans les galeries du Muséum d'Histoire Naturelle, parmi leurs dépouilles conservées; Précédé du discours d'ouverture du Cours de Zoologie, donné dans le Muséum National d'Histoire Naturelle l'an 8 de la République. Published by the author and Deterville, Paris: viii + 432 pp
 Adams H. & Adams A. (1853-1858). The genera of Recent Mollusca; arranged according to their organization. London, van Voorst. Vol. 1: xl + 484 pp.; vol. 2: 661 pp.; vol. 3: 138 pls. [Published in parts: Vol. 1: i-xl (1858), 1-256 (1853), 257-484 (1854). Vol. 2: 1-92 (1854), 93-284 (1855), 285-412 (1856), 413-540 (1857), 541-661 (1858). Vol. 3: pl. 1-32 (1853), 33-96 (1855), 97-112 (1856), 113-128 (1857), 129-138 (1858)
 Mabille, J. (1886). Étude monographique du genre Concholepas. Annales de Malacologie, 2 (3): 261-282, pl. 3-5. Paris 

 
Gastropod genera
Taxa named by Jean-Baptiste Lamarck